Hilde Gjermundshaug Pedersen (born 8 November 1964) is a Norwegian cross-country skier. Her first Olympic medal was a silver 4 × 5 km relay at the 2002 Winter Olympics in Salt Lake City. At the 2006 Winter Olympics in Turin, she took the bronze medal in the 10 km classical interval start event. Pedersen is the oldest woman ever to win a cross country skiing World Cup race, which she did at age 41 in January 2006 in Otepää, Estonia.

Gjermundshaug Pedersen has also won six medals at the FIS Nordic World Ski Championships, including two golds (4 × 5 km relay, team sprint: both 2005), two silvers (4 × 5 km relay: 2001, 2003), and two bronzes (Individual sprint, 10 km: both 2003).

In 2004, she won Tjejvasan.

She also won the Egebergs Ærespris in 2002. This prestigious prize is awarded to athletes who reach international top level in one sport and concurrently perform at national level (or better) in a second sport. Gjermundshaug Pedersen has also competed in ski orienteering, a sport in which she received three silver medals and two bronze medals in the World championships, and she has also won the overall World Cup (1997).

At age 42, Gjermundshaug Pedersen decided to make a comeback in the World Cup for the 2006–07 season. In January 2008 she won her seventh Norwegian Championships gold medal, in the 10 km interval start race.

An unparalleled historic curiosum is the Norwegian Cross-Country Skiing Championship 3 × 5 km relay of 2006, where the entire winning team of Nybygda consisted of Gjermundshaug Pedersens: mother Hilde with her two twin daughters Eli and Ida.

Cross-country skiing results
All results are sourced from the International Ski Federation (FIS).

Olympic Games
 2 medals – (1 gold, 1 bronze)

World Championships
 6 medals – (2 gold, 2 silver, 2 bronze)

World Cup

Season standings

Individual podiums
1 victory  
13 podiums

Team podiums

 16 victories – (9 , 7 ) 
 24 podiums – (17 , 7 )

References

External links

Cross-country skiers at the 2002 Winter Olympics
Cross-country skiers at the 2006 Winter Olympics
Living people
Norwegian female cross-country skiers
Norwegian orienteers
Female orienteers
Olympic cross-country skiers of Norway
Olympic silver medalists for Norway
Olympic bronze medalists for Norway
1964 births
Ski-orienteers
Olympic medalists in cross-country skiing
FIS Nordic World Ski Championships medalists in cross-country skiing
Medalists at the 2006 Winter Olympics
Medalists at the 2002 Winter Olympics
Sportspeople from Hamar